The Interethnic Association for the Development of the Peruvian Rainforest (AIDESEP) is a Peruvian national Indigenous rights organization. A National Board of Directors is elected by nine regional organizations every five years. The organization comprises 109 federations, representing 2,439 communities of roughly 650,000 Indigenous people who speak a plurality of languages.

Members of AIDESEP work to improve the health, education, housing, and organization of Indigenous peoples.

Its current president is Lizardo Cauper Pezo, who succeeded Henderson Rengifo Hualinga and Alberto Pizango.

AIDESEP is a member organization of the Coordinator of Indigenous Organizations of the Amazon River Basin (COICA).

Members
AIDESEP was founded by:

 Consejo Aguaruna-Huambisa (CAH), representing the Aguaruna and Huambisa people of the Amazonas region
 Asociación de Comunidades Asháninkas del valle de Pichis (ACONAP), representing the Asháninka people of Pichis Valley in the Pasco Region
 Federación de Comunidades Nativas del Ucayali (FECONAU), Ucayali Region
 Federación Nativa de Madre de Dios (FENAMAD), representing the Indigenous peoples of the Madre de Dios Region
 Mashco-Piro people of the Ucayali Region
 Amuesha people of the Pasco Region
 Matsés people of the Loreto Region

See also
 Indigenous peoples in Peru
 2009 Peruvian political crisis

References

External links
 

Indigenous organisations in Peru
Organisations based in Peru
Environmental organisations based in Peru
Indigenous topics of the Amazon